Blue Ice is a 1992 crime thriller film directed by Russell Mulcahy and starring Michael Caine and Sean Young.

Premise 
Blue Ice is a crime thriller involving a former spy (Caine), who is a jazz-club owner, who becomes immersed again in the world of espionage and counter-intelligence.

Cast 
 Michael Caine as Harry Anders
 Sean Young as Stacy Mansdorf
 Ian Holm as Sir Hector
 Bob Hoskins as Sam Garcia
 Jack Shepherd as Stevens
 Bobby Short as Buddy
 Alun Armstrong as Osgood
 Alan MacNaughtan as Lewis Mandorf
 Sam Kelly as George
 Phil Davis as Westy
 Patricia Hayes as Old Woman

The band in Harry's club is portrayed by a number of accomplished musicians, including Rolling Stones drummer Charlie Watts

 Tom Boyd ... oboe
 Dave Green ... bass
 Michael Kamen ... orchestrator
 Anthony Kerr ... vibes
 Peter King ... alto sax
 Gerard Presencer ... trumpet
 Pete Thomas ... saxophone/composer:additional music
 Charlie Watts ... drums
 Steve Williamson ... tenor sax

Production 
According to the credits, the character of "Harry Anders" is based on the Ted Allbeury character "Tad Anders." The character was featured in Allbeury's novels Snowball, Palomino Blonde and The Judas Factor. In the books he is described as being of Polish-British descent; in the movie he is portrayed as English. The name also refers to "Harry Palmer", a British spy whom Caine portrayed in an earlier series of films.

References

External links

1992 films
1992 action thriller films
1990s English-language films
1990s spy films
American action thriller films
British spy films
Films directed by Russell Mulcahy
Films produced by Martin Bregman
Films scored by Michael Kamen
Films shot in London
1990s American films
1990s British films